Statistics of Second Division Football Tournament in the 2017 season.

Group stage
From each group, the top two teams will be advanced for the Semi-finals.

All times listed are Maldives Standard Time.

Group 1

Group 2

Semi-finals

Final

Awards

References

Maldivian Second Division Football Tournament seasons
Maldives
Maldives
2